Ruskin may refer to:

Surname 
Surname Ruskin, also Russkin, Russkina, Ruskina. The name occurs especially in Russia, United States and some Asian countries.

John Ruskin (1819–1900), an English author, poet and artist, most famous for his work as art critic and social critic, and for his writing on the architecture of Venice.

A number of institutions and locations have been named after John Ruskin, including two places in the United States and one in Canada. For a short period "Ruskin" was also adopted as a forename. The name Ruskin is derived from the old given name Rose and the diminutive Kin.

Effie Ruskin, wife of John Ruskin
Harry Ruskin, American screenwriter
Ira Ruskin, American politician
Joseph Ruskin, American character actor
Morris Ruskin, American independent film producer and CEO
Scott Ruskin (baseball), American baseball player
Scott Ruskin (cricketer),  English cricketer
Sheila Ruskin, English actress
Susan Ruskin, American film producer
Val Rapava-Ruskin, English rugby union player

Edward Ruskin, fictional character of the British soap opera Emmerdale Farm

Places
Ruskin, British Columbia, Canada
Ruskin, Iran, a village in Kerman Province, Iran
In the United States:
Ruskin, Florida
Ruskin, Georgia
Ruskin, Minnesota
Ruskin, Nebraska
Ruskin Colony, a utopian socialist colony which existed in Dickson County, Tennessee from 1894 to 1899 (the Florida and British Columbia Ruskins were also Ruskinite colonies)
Ruskin Drive, a road in Altoona, Pennsylvania

Institutions
Anglia Ruskin University, in Cambridge, England
"The Ruskin", the colloquial short form for the Ruskin School of Drawing and Fine Art, Oxford University
Ruskin College, Oxford, an adult education college named after John Ruskin
Ruskin Colleges, a group of U.S. colleges named after John Ruskin 
Ruskin Gallery, in Sheffield
Ruskin Museum, in Coniston, Cumbria
Ruskin Pottery, an English pottery studio in operation between 1898 and 1935
Ruskin Hall, a residence hall at the University of Pittsburgh and a National Historic Place
Ruskin High School (disambiguation)
Ruskin Library; Lancaster University, United Kingdom.

Forename
Ruskin Bond, an Indian author of British descent
Ruskin Spear, a British painter

Other
Ruskin Dam, in British Columbia, Canada
Ruskin's Ride, a bridleway in Oxford, England
A type of fried potato skin snack that's a clipped version of "russet skin", and may or may not be made from russet potato skins.